Events in the year 2019 in the United Arab Emirates.

Incumbents
 President: Khalifa bin Zayed Al Nahyan
 Prime Minister: Mohammed bin Rashid Al Maktoum

Events 

 February 3 – Pope Francis makes a historic trip to Abu Dhabi meeting Ahmed al-Tayeb. Both sign on document "Human Fraternity For World Peace And Living Together".
 March 9 – Sheikha Latifa Al Maktoum, an Emirati princess, has not been seen in public since she attempted a daring escape from Dubai with her best friend.

Deaths

References

 
Years of the 21st century in the United Arab Emirates
United Arab Emirates
United Arab Emirates
2010s in the United Arab Emirates